The York Lions Football team represents York University in Toronto, Ontario in the sport of Canadian football in U Sports. The York Lions football team has been in continuous operation since 1968 and are one of two teams currently playing in U Sports football to have never won a conference championship. The other team, the Sherbrooke Vert et Or, did not begin their current program until 2003.

The Lions were previously known as the York Yeomen until all York varsity teams changed their nicknames to the Lions in 2003.

History

Early History
The York Lions football program, then known as the Yeomen, started play in 1969 within the Central Canada Intercollegiate Football Conference (CCIFC). The team was founded by Nobby Wirkowski, who also served as the teams first Head Coach. Afterwards, the program joined the Ontario University Athletic Association (OUAA) in 1971 before joining with the Ontario Quebec Intercollegiate Football Conference (OQIFC) in 1974. 

York then joined the OUA in 1980. From 1980 to 1987, York had a record of 22 wins and 53 losses. From 1988 to 1995, the Yeomen did not win a single game, setting the CIAU/CIS football record of 47-straight losses. This record was later broken with the Toronto Varsity Blues having a 49-game losing streak from 2001 to 2008.

1995-2009

Surprisingly in 1995, the Yeomen went from an 0-8 record to 4-4 under Head Coach Tom Arnott, who was in his 4th year as Head Coach with York, leading him to be named the OUA coach of the year. Arnott would win the award again in 1997 after leading the Yeomen to a 6-2 record and 4th place finish in the OUA. Arnott would leave York in 2001 to take the Guelph Gryphons Head Coach position, his alma mater. Afterwards, Tom Gretes, the Yeomen's Defensive coordinator (DC), would be promoted to Head Coach.

After Queen's and Ottawa joined the OUA in 2001, the playoffs were expanded to include eight teams, in which that time the Yeomen/Lions would qualify for the playoffs for four consecutive seasons. This format was discontinued after the 2003 season and the Lions have not made a playoff appearance since 2004.

In the 2006 offseason, York fired Gretes due to an incident the York athletics banquet that year and named Offensive Coordinator (OC) Andy McEvoy as the interim replacement. McEvoy led the team for the 2007 season before being replaced with former CFLer and Saint Mary's DC Mike McLean prior to the 2008 season with McEvoy returning as the OC.  After two seasons of futility and a lack of improvement, McLean was fired with an 0-16 record with the athletic department citing 'serious philosophical differences' and a 'lack of accountability'.

Warren Craney Era

2010-2012
In May 2010, York hired former Concordia Stingers DC Warren Craney to become the programs 9th Head Coach. While there was no improvement in the 2010 season, in 2011 Craney guided the Lions to their first win in 3 seasons against the Waterloo Warriors 20-18 in overtime - snapping a 29-game losing streak for the program.

In 2012, the Lions finished with a 2–6 record, the most wins for the program since 2005 and in 7th place, their highest finish in eight years.  This included an impressive 47-36 win over the Ottawa Gee-Gees that many saw as the turning point for the program going forward.

2013 Offseason/Dan Younis Arrest
However, the 2013 offseason managed to take away much of the momentum the team had built up to that point. In January, the teams OC since 2010, Michael Faulds, was hired as the new Head Coach of the Laurier Golden Hawks.
Since then, the Lions haven't been able to produce offensively at the same level since Faulds was the offensive coordinator. However, much worse news happened in February, as the teams recruiting coordinator, Daniel Younis, was arrested on charges relating to child pornography and child-luring. York University immediately severed ties with Younis following the arrest. Later that April, Younis was charged with eight more counts of child-luring. This led to many issues and concerns with incoming recruits who were in direct contact with Younis, as well with those who were not as the news made national headlines. This severely affected the teams ability to recruit  and affected the program in the years following.

2013-2022
In 2013, the Lions finished 2-6 leading to an 8th overall finish in the OUA and matching their previous season's record. Following that season, Craney signed a contract extension to remain at the helm of the program. The next two seasons saw the effects of the 2013 offseason hit the program hard as the Lions went 0-8 in the 2014 season, which started with back-to-back massive losses; one a 61-0 loss to the Western Mustangs, and the other a 70-0 loss to their rivals, the Toronto Varsity Blues. In 2015, the Lions improved to a 1-7 record with their lone win coming against the Waterloo Warriors. The team had a 2–6 record in 2016, showing some improvement, but regressed the following year with a one-win season in 2017. The Lions won three games in 2018, which was their highest win total in 13 years, but still finished outside of playoff contention. The Lions again regressed following a stronger year, with a 1–7 finish in 2019. 

After a cancelled 2020 season, the Lions finished 0-6 in a shortened 2021 season. After the season on April 2, 2022, Warren Craney was put on a leave of absence as the school conducted a thorough review and investigation of the football program. Upon the conclusion of the investigation, Craney was reinstated as the Head Football Coach for the 2022 season. During that 2022 season, the Lions finished 1-7 with their lone win coming against the McMaster Marauders who had to forfeit the contest for having an ineligible player on their roster. 

After the season, Craney stepped down as Head Coach with Defensive coordinator Sammy Okpro being named the Interim Head Coach. Craney was the longest tenured Head Coach in the history of the program.

Season-by-season record

The following is the record of the York Lions football team since 1995:

Head Coaches

Red & Blue Bowl

The Lions maintain a competitive rivalry with their crosstown rivals, the Toronto Varsity Blues, and the two teams play annually in a game called the Red & Blue Bowl. The first meeting occurred on September 11, 1970, which was an exhibition match won by the Varsity Blues. At a time when Toronto was a dominant program, the Varsity Blues won the first 14 match ups until York won their first Red & Blue Bowl game in 1984. York's longest stretch of dominance began in 1996 when the Lions won their first of 12 consecutive matches, which ended after their 2007 victory. Overall, as of the 2022 season, the Lions hold a  record in the Red & Blue Bowl.

National award winners
Jeff Johnson – Peter Gorman Trophy (1996)
Jacob Janke – Russ Jackson Award (2019)

York Lions in the CFL
As of the end of the 2022 CFL season, six former Lions players were on CFL teams' rosters:
Daniel Amoako, Calgary Stampeders
Jamal Campbell, Saskatchewan Roughriders
Luther Hakunavanhu, Calgary Stampeders
Colton Hunchak, Calgary Stampeders
Chris Kolankowski, Winnipeg Blue Bombers
James Tuck, Saskatchewan Roughriders

As of the end of the 2022 NFL season, one former Lions player was on an NFL team's roster:
Nikola Kalinic, Indianapolis Colts

References

External links
 

 
1968 establishments in Ontario
Sports clubs established in 1968
Canadian football teams in Toronto
U Sports teams
U Sports football teams
Lions
York Lions